"When You Touch Me" is a song by English dance band Freemasons. It was released as the 6th single from their second studio album Unmixed and features vocals from English dance music vocalist and songwriter Katherine Ellis.

Music video
The music video was inspired by the "Rich Man's Frug" scene from the 1969 musical film Sweet Charity. Although Katherine Ellis sings lead vocals in the song, she is not featured in the video and instead features dancer Stephanie Fitzpatrick miming over the track and dancing as the lead in the video.

Track listing

Charts

References

2008 singles
Freemasons (band) songs
2008 songs